Federal Highway 293 (Carretera Federal 293) is a Federal Highway of Mexico, located entirely within Quintana Roo. It connects Mexican Federal Highway 184 at Polyuc to Mexican Federal Highway 307 near Pedro Antonio Santos.

References

293